Peter Samuel Pierson (born February 4, 1971) is a former NFL offensive tackle who played seven seasons with the Tampa Bay Buccaneers. He was selected by the Buccaneers in the fifth round of the 1994 NFL Draft.

Pierson was released by the Buccaneers as a rookie in 1995, and was signed by the Kansas City Chiefs. After approximately one week one the Chiefs practice squad, he was released and subsequently re-signed by the Bucs. He remained with the Bucs for the season, but did not play in any games (at least part of this time was on the Bucs' practice squad).

Pierson spent the 1995 season as a backup right tackle (12 games, four starts), but moved mainly to the left side when the Bucs hired Tony Dungy in 1996. Stuck behind one of the NFL's upper echelon left tackles, Paul Gruber, Pierson played in 57 games with two starts from 1996 to 1999.

When Gruber suffered a broken left leg in the season finale of the 1999 season, Pierson started the Bucs' playoff contests and made 15 starts in 2000 with Gruber unavailable (the injury led to Gruber's retirement).

In 2001, Pierson shared time with George Hegamin at left tackle, appearing in 15 games. Pierson was released by the Bucs in August 2002. He signed with Dungy and the Colts, and appeared in two games as a reserve in his final NFL season.

In his nine-year career, Pierson appeared in 121 games and made 21 starts.

References

1971 births
Living people
American football offensive tackles
Washington Huskies football players
Tampa Bay Buccaneers players
Indianapolis Colts players
Players of American football from Portland, Oregon
David Douglas High School alumni